Les Fonts is a neighbourhood in Terrassa in the comarca of Vallès Occidental, located in Barcelona, Catalonia, Spain.

Population
As of 2009, the population is 2,336. The postal code is 08228.

Transportation
The town is served by the Les Fonts station of the FGC line S1.

Name
The name Les Fonts is Catalan for The Fountains.

References

Vallès Occidental